The Warsaw–Grodzisk Mazowiecki railway is a 30 kilometre long, double-tracked, electrified suburban railway line that connects Warsaw with Grodzisk Mazowiecki. It runs parallel to the long-distance Warsaw–Katowice line.

Opening
The line was opened in 1967. Since then it is used by suburban connections, while long-distance passenger and goods trains run on the parallel line.

Modernisation
In November 2015 PKP PLK announced a tender for the modernisation of line 447 on the section between Warszawa Włochy and Grodzisk Mazowiecki. As part of modernisation, which was to improve movements in the Warsaw agglomeration, the stations on the line were rebuilt and a new station in Parzniew was built. After completion of the work the line speed was increased from 60–80 km/h to 120 km/h. Works were carried out in the years 2016–2019.

Usage
The line is used by Koleje Mazowieckie and Szybka Kolej Miejska (the latter one only between Warsaw and Pruszków).

See also 
 Railway lines of Poland

References

External links 
 Warsaw–Grodzisk Mazowiecki line in Baza Kolejowa (in Polish)
 Warsaw-Katowice line in Baza Kolejowa (in Polish)

Railway lines in Poland
Railway lines opened in 1927